Jillian Dowding (born 1992), known professionally as JJ Wilde is a Canadian rock singer from Kitchener, Ontario. She released her debut EP, Wilde Eyes, Steady Hands, in 2019. Her debut single "The Rush" simultaneously reached #1 on Canada's modern rock, active rock and mainstream rock charts in May 2020, only one of eleven songs to accomplish the feat. She followed up with her debut album Ruthless in 2020. The album won Rock Album of the Year at the 2021 Juno Awards, making Wilde the first woman to win the award in 25 years, since Alanis Morissette won in 1996. She also released an EP Wilde in 2021.

In fall 2020 she was selected alongside SonReal, The OBGMs and Northcote as one of four musical acts to be promoted by Collective Arts Brewing's Audio/Visual Lager, which publicizes independent musicians with special limited edition band-themed cans.

Discography

Studio albums 

 Ruthless (2020)

EPs 

 Wilde Eyes, Steady Hands (2019)
 Wilde (2021)

References

21st-century Canadian women singers
Canadian women rock singers
Musicians from Kitchener, Ontario
Living people
1992 births
Juno Award for Rock Album of the Year winners